Grandpa Walrus (Original title (FR): Pépé le morse) is an animated short film directed by Lucrèce Andreae and produced by Caïmans Productions. The short has been presented and won awards in a number of festivals including in Cannes Film Festival, The Annecy International Animation Film Festival where it won The Audience Award., winner of The César Award for Best Animated Short Film at the french Motion Picture César Academy, nominated at the Annie Awards and Shortlisted at the Oscars.

Plot

On the windy and cloudy beach, Granny is praying, Mum is shouting, the sisters don't care, Lucas is alone. Grandpa was a weird guy, now he's dead.

Awards

Since its launch, the film has received numerous awards, and selected in more than 100 festivals around the world.

References

External links
 
 
 

2017 animated films
2017 films
2010s French animated films
2010s animated short films
French animated short films
2017 short films